Vegreville—Wainwright was a federal electoral district in Alberta, Canada, that was represented in the House of Commons of Canada from 2004 to 2015.

History
This riding was created in 2003 from Lakeland, Elk Island and Crowfoot ridings. It now represents Lamont County, the County of Two Hills No. 21, the County of Minburn No. 27, Strathcona County, Beaver County, the County of Vermilion River, Flagstaff County, the Municipal District of Provost No. 52, and the Alberta portion of Lloydminster.

Member of Parliament

This riding has elected the following Member of Parliament:

Current Member of Parliament
Its Member of Parliament is Leon Benoit, a former economist and farmer. He was first elected to Parliament in the 1993 election. He is a member of the Conservative Party of Canada. In the last parliamentary session, he served as chair of the Standing Committee on Government Operations and Estimates.

Election results

See also
 List of Canadian federal electoral districts
 Past Canadian electoral districts

References
 
 
 Expenditures - 2008
 Expenditures - 2004

Notes

External links
 Website of the Parliament of Canada

Former federal electoral districts of Alberta
Lloydminster
Two Hills, Alberta